Decatur is a town in and the county seat of Newton County, Mississippi. The population was 1,841 at the 2010 census. This town is named after war hero Stephen Decatur, Jr.

Geography
Decatur is located at  (32.439557, -89.112047).

Demographics

2020 census

As of the 2020 United States Census, there were 1,945 people, 614 households, and 385 families residing in the town.

2000
As of the census of 2000, there were 1,426 people, 407 households, and 269 families residing in the town. The population density was 1,379.9 people per square mile (534.5/km2). There were 463 housing units at an average density of 448.0 per square mile (173.6/km2). The racial makeup of the town was 66.41% White, 32.54% African American, 0.56% Native American, 0.14% Asian, and 0.35% from two or more races. Hispanic or Latino of any race were 1.05% of the population.

There were 407 households, out of which 31.0% had children under the age of 18 living with them, 44.5% were married couples living together, 18.2% had a female householder with no husband present, and 33.9% were non-families. 30.7% of all households were made up of individuals, and 9.6% had someone living alone who was 65 years of age or older. The average household size was 2.30 and the average family size was 2.85.

In the town, the population was spread out, with 16.5% under the age of 18, 41.8% from 18 to 24, 16.4% from 25 to 44, 14.9% from 45 to 64, and 10.3% who were 65 years of age or older. The median age was 21 years. For every 100 females, there were 100.6 males. For every 100 females age 18 and over, there were 97.3 males.

The median income for a household in the town was $28,333, and the median income for a family was $37,115. Males had a median income of $28,875 versus $20,000 for females. The per capita income for the town was $10,839. About 14.8% of families and 19.4% of the population were below the poverty line, including 28.7% of those under age 18 and 10.3% of those age 65 or over.

Notable people
Lamar Blount, former end in the National Football League
 Charles Evers, first post-Reconstruction African American mayor in Mississippi
 Medgar Evers, civil rights activist
 W. H. Johnson Jr., state legislator

See also 
 American Legion Hut (Decatur, Mississippi)

References

Towns in Newton County, Mississippi
Towns in Mississippi
County seats in Mississippi